Cwmduad (Welsh "Cwm" valley + "duad" blackness (river Duad, in English Blackcombe)) is a village in Carmarthenshire, West Wales.

Location 
Cwmduad is located on the A484, just north of Cynwyl Elfed. The village is found at the confluence of the River Duad and River Bele. The nearest major settlements are Carmarthen to the South and Newcastle Emlyn to the North.

History 
A tollgate was located in Cwmduad village. There was at one time also a village school although this has since closed and the nearest primary school is now found at neighbouring Cynwyl Elfed. The village's baptist church was built in 1869 and restored in 1906.

Villages in Carmarthenshire